Tad Jones (born October 23, 1972) is a United States Republican politician from Oklahoma. Jones served in the Oklahoma House of Representatives as the Majority Floor Leader.

Jones was first elected to the House of Representatives in 1998. Due to term limits placed on him by the Oklahoma Constitution, his final term ended in November 2010.

He currently resides in Claremore with his wife Samantha and their three children, Logan, Blake and Connor.

Early life and career
Jones was born in Tucson, Arizona on October 23, 1972. His parents are Ted and Corky (Burkert) Jones. Tad graduated from Oologah High School in 1991 and then went to the University of Mississippi as a walk-on QB. Tad Jones transferred to the University of Tulsa in 1993 where he was a walk-on QB for the Golden Hurricane and he eventually gained a football scholarship. He graduated from Tulsa University in 1996 and he earned a degree in marketing. Jones is a member of the Fellowship of Christian Athletes and Rotary International.

Political career
Jones entered the Legislature in 1998 as a Republican in the then Democrat-controlled Oklahoma House of Representatives. For several years, rarely did more than one of his bills become law. By 2005, however, Jones was seeing more success with three bills from the 2005 legislative session signed into law, including the "Inpatient Mental Health and Substance Abuse Treatment of Minors Act".

Prior to becoming House Majority Leader, Jones served as the chair of the House education committee. Education bills he has authored and that were signed into law include a bill that created Oklahoma's Academic Achievement Award (AAA) and a measure that authorized the Board of Education to license teachers from the Teach for American program.

References

1972 births
Living people
People from Claremore, Oklahoma
Politicians from Tucson, Arizona
University of Tulsa alumni
Republican Party members of the Oklahoma House of Representatives
21st-century American politicians